The Phillips County Courthouse is located at 622 Cherry Street in Helena, the county seat of Phillips County, Arkansas.  It is a rectangular brick structure, designed by architect Frank W. Gibb and built in 1914.  It is Classical Revival in style, with two full stories above a raised basement, and a flat roof.  Its most prominent feature is a series of engaged fluted Corinthian columns, two stories in height, which line three sides of the building.  Its interior has ornate woodwork and plasterwork that is in excellent condition.

The building was listed on the National Register of Historic Places in 1977.

See also
National Register of Historic Places listings in Phillips County, Arkansas

References

Courthouses on the National Register of Historic Places in Arkansas
Government buildings completed in 1914
Buildings and structures in Phillips County, Arkansas
County courthouses in Arkansas
National Register of Historic Places in Phillips County, Arkansas